Michael Sziedat (born 22 August 1952) is a former German football player.

Sziedat played 379 times for Hertha BSC and Eintracht Frankfurt in the Bundesliga, netting 16 goals. His 280 Bundesliga caps for Berlin are still a club record. In 1971 he started his pro career at Hertha and left them after being relegated in 1980 to play for the "Eagles" in Frankfurt.

Honours

Club 
Eintracht Frankfurt
 DFB-Pokal: 1980–81

Hertha BSC
 DFB-Pokal: runner-up 1976–77, 1978–79
 Bundesliga: runner-up 1974–75

External links
 Michael Sziedat at eintracht-archiv.de

1952 births
Living people
German footballers
Hertha BSC players
Eintracht Frankfurt players
Bundesliga players
BFC Preussen players
Association football defenders